The  was an internal department of the Ministry of the Interior that existed until 1940. It was in charge of administrative matters related to shrines, Shinkan, and Kannushi.

It was split off from the Bureau of Shrines and Temples in 1900 with other religions and Sect Shinto being covered under the Bureau of Religions.

On April 26, 1900, under the basic policy of the Meiji Restoration government that "shrines are the state's religious ceremonies," the Ministry of Home Affairs’ Shrines and Temple Bureau was abolished and reorganized into the Bureau of Shrines, which administered state Shinto, and the Bureau of Religions, which administered other religions including Buddhism, and Sect Shinto... In other words, the Ministry of Home Affairs' official regulations were revised, seven bureaus were established in the Ministry, the Bureau of Shrines was added before the Regional Bureaus, and the Shrines and Temple Bureau was renamed the Bureau of Religion. The Bureau of Shrines was criticized by the Jodo Shinshu sect, but the Bureau of Shrines itself was not a very large organization.

It was staffed by one director, one secretary, one archivist, two engineers, one clerk, two assistant archivists, and others.

It was abolished on November 9, 1940 (Showa 15) with the establishment of the Institute of Divinities

Bibliography 

 秦郁彦編『日本官僚制総合事典：1868 - 2000』東京大学出版会、2001年。

See also 

 Department of Divinities
 Ministry of Religion (Japan)
 State Shinto
 Association of Shinto Shrines

References

Government agencies disestablished in 1940
Government agencies established in 1900
State Shinto
Home Ministry (Japan)
Pages with unreviewed translations